Holger Reenberg (3 September 1872 – 21 March 1942) was a Danish actor. He appeared in more than 20 films between 1912 and 1940.

Selected filmography
 An Artist of Life (1925)
 Hotel Paradis (1931)
 Life on the Hegn Farm (1938)

References

External links

1872 births
1942 deaths
Danish male film actors
Place of birth missing